Al-Hurriya, (freedom) variously transcribed as al-Hourriya, al-Hurriyeh, etc.) is a Palestinian political newspaper affiliated with the Marxist-Leninist Democratic Front for the Liberation of Palestine (DFLP). First published in Beirut on January 4, 1960, by the Arab Nationalist Movement (ANM), under the editorship of Muhsin Ibrahim it became increasingly socialist, against the opposition of ANM founders and older members.

In 1969 al-Hurriya became the joint organ of the DFLP and the Communist Action Organization in Lebanon. Since 1977 it is the central organ of DFLP.

Al-Hurriya is today edited in Syria, but published in several countries in the Arab world. It reports mainly on party matters and Palestinian politics.

Notes

External links 
 al-Hurriya Magazine (in Arabic)

1960 establishments in Lebanon
Arabic-language newspapers
Newspapers published in Beirut
Daily newspapers published in Syria
Newspapers published in the State of Palestine
Newspapers established in 1960
Daily newspapers published in Lebanon